Elizabeth Boulevard Historic District is located in the southern part of Fort Worth, Texas.

It was added to the National Register in November 16, 1979.

See also

National Register of Historic Places listings in Tarrant County, Texas

References

External links

National Register of Historic Places in Fort Worth, Texas
Historic districts in Fort Worth, Texas
Historic districts on the National Register of Historic Places in Texas